Isabelle Boineau (born 13 June 1989) is a French professional golfer who plays on the Ladies European Tour. In 2016 she won the Ladies Scottish Open and finished 5th in the LET Order of Merit.

Amateur career
Boineau was born in Marseille and started to play golf in 1999 aged 10 at Allauch Golf Club. Her amateur achievements include runner up at The Spirit International Golf Tournamentand the Duke of York Young Champions Trophy in 2007. She was National Golf Champion in France twice, in 2003 and 2007, and French Women's International champion in 2006.

In 2006 she finished third at the European Young Masters, and she represented France at the 2006 Espirito Santo Trophy, where her team finished 4th.

Boineau  earned a degree in Business Administration and Sports Management at the University of Arizona where she was part of the Arizona Wildcats women's golf team.

Professional career
Boineau turned professional in 2013 and joined the Symetra Tour, where she came close to secure her maiden professional win in her first start, the Guardian Retirement Championship. Having held the lead, she eventually lost a playoff to Christine Song.

At the end of the year she finished T15 at the Lalla Aicha Tour School Final Qualifying, and joined the Ladies European Tour in 2014. In her rookie year her best finish was fifth in the Lacoste Ladies Open de France.

In 2016, Boineau won her first LET title, the Ladies Scottish Open, in tough conditions at Dundonald Links. Ranked 286 in the world at the start of the tournament, she carded a final round of 67 to finish 11 under, one shot ahead of Linda Wessberg and two clear of Becky Morgan and American Beth Allen.

In December 2016 she represented Europe at The Queens held in Japan. She finished 5th in the 2016 LET Order of Merit, which also qualified her for the 2017 U.S. Women's Open.

In March 2017 Boineau reached a world rank of 156. She won the 2017 Jabra Ladies Open at Evian Resort Golf Club, when it was a LETAS tournament, and finished T10 in 2018, when it was played as a Dual-Ranking event with the LET.

Amateur wins
2006 French International Ladies Amateur Championship
2011 Arizona Wildcat Invitational

Professional wins (2)

Ladies European Tour wins (1)

LET Access Series wins (1)

Results in LPGA majors

CUT = missed the half-way cut
"T" = tied

Team appearances
Amateur
Espirito Santo Trophy (representing France): 2006
European Young Masters (representing France): 2006
European Ladies' Team Championship (representing France): 2008

Professional
The Queens (representing Europe): 2016

References

External links

French female golfers
Arizona Wildcats women's golfers
Ladies European Tour golfers
Sportspeople from Marseille
1989 births
Living people
21st-century French women